Dr. Andrew Owusu (born July 8, 1972) is a Ghanaian athlete who competed in the triple jump and long jump.

His personal best in the triple jump is 17.23 meters, achieved in August 1998 in Dakar. This is the current Ghanaian record as well as the fourth best triple jump result in Africa, behind Ndabazinhle Mdhlongwa (17.34 m), Ajayi Agbebaku (17.26 m) and Khotso Mokoena (17.25 m). His personal best in the long jump is 8.12 meters, achieved on June 24, 1995, in Saarijärvi. His personal best in the long jump was a Ghanaian record between 1995 and 2003.

He received a doctorate degree from Middle Tennessee State University in 2004 and, as of 2021, is a Full Professor in the public health area within the Health and Human Performance Department at Middle Tennessee State University (MTSU). He also volunteers as a Track & Field assistant coach at MTSU in the horizontal jumping events.

Dr. Owusu was the country (Ghana) coordinator for the Ghana School-based Student Health Surveillance System (2006–2020). The latter surveillance system was jointly managed in partnership with the World Health Organization (WHO), US Centers for Disease Control and Prevention (CDC) and Ghana Education Service (GES).

Dr. Owusu attended the Presbyterian Boys' Secondary School (Presec Legon) and the University of Alabama, where he was an 8-time All-American with the Alabama Crimson Tide's Track and Field Team, competing in the long jump and triple jump.  He became the university's record-holder in the Long Jump of Indoor Track and the Triple Jump of Outdoor Track, and was the 1996 NCAA National Champion in the Long Jump of NCAA Indoor Track and Field.  He competed in the Summer 1996 Olympic Games (Atlanta), 2000 Olympic Games (Sydney) and 2004 Olympic Games (Athens), representing Ghana.

Competition record

1996 NCAA National Champion in Long Jump Indoor Track and Field - first place

1Did not start in the final

References

External links

1972 births
Living people
Ghanaian male triple jumpers
Ghanaian male long jumpers
Athletes (track and field) at the 1994 Commonwealth Games
Athletes (track and field) at the 1998 Commonwealth Games
Athletes (track and field) at the 2002 Commonwealth Games
Athletes (track and field) at the 1996 Summer Olympics
Athletes (track and field) at the 2000 Summer Olympics
Athletes (track and field) at the 2004 Summer Olympics
Olympic athletes of Ghana
Middle Tennessee State University alumni
Middle Tennessee State University faculty
Commonwealth Games medallists in athletics
Commonwealth Games silver medallists for Ghana
African Games gold medalists for Ghana
African Games medalists in athletics (track and field)
Presbyterian Boys' Senior High School alumni
Athletes (track and field) at the 1995 All-Africa Games
Athletes (track and field) at the 1999 All-Africa Games
Athletes (track and field) at the 2003 All-Africa Games
Medallists at the 1998 Commonwealth Games